L36 may refer to:
 60S ribosomal protein L36
 Buick L36 engine
 , a sloop of the Royal Navy
 Rio Linda Airport, in Sacramento County, California
 Scania-Vabis L36, a Swedish truck